Bresternica ( or ) is a settlement on the left bank of the Drava River in northeastern Slovenia in the City Municipality of Maribor. After the Second World War, a Yugoslav labor camp for political prisoners operated in Bresternica until the end of 1945.

References

External links

Bresternica on Geopedia

Populated places in the City Municipality of Maribor